Dongfeng Peugeot-Citroën, formerly Dongfeng Peugeot-Citroën Automobile Co., Ltd. (DPCA) from 1992 to 2021, is an equally owned Chinese joint venture between the automobile manufacturers Dongfeng Motor Corporation and Stellantis (known as PSA Peugeot Citroën at the time of the formation of the joint venture). Based in Wuhan, capital of Hubei province, it manufactures Peugeot and Citroën models for sale in China.

Its cars are well liked by consumers, and the Citroën brand received one of the highest scores in a 2014 customer satisfaction survey done by JD Power in China.

Not all Stellantis products sold in China were sold or manufactured by its joint venture with Dongfeng; DS Automobiles models were once the domain of the former Changan PSA joint venture with Changan Automobile.

DPCA also produces Dongfeng Fengshen-branded consumer vehicles in the same factories that manufacture the Stellantis models these private label cars are based on.

History

The Peugeot and Citroën brands separately tried to enter the China market in the 1980s. Citroën sold the CX model in 1984, and it even appeared in a Chinese film. At the time, Citroën was competing with Volkswagen for the "large car" contract with SAIC Motor, and Volkswagen won, investing $2 Billion in the China market from 1984 to 1998. Peugeot also saw lackluster results.  In 1985, it established a joint venture with the government of Guangzhou, Guangzhou Peugeot Automobile Company, which built the 1968 model Peugeot 504 and was defunct by 1997.

The current Dongfeng Peugeot-Citroën comes from a second chance at market entrance for Citroën provided by 'Second Auto Works' (Dongfeng), in 1992. Realizing it lacked a consumer product line, state-owned vehicle maker Dongfeng Motor Corporation initially approached Toyota in the hopes of establishing a joint venture but was rebuffed leading to the same offer being afforded Citroën. Talks were reported to have taken place in Paris as early as the last 1980s with agreement reached in 1990. However, the project was delayed by two years due to French government resistance following the Tiananmen Square massacre, and it only came off the ground in 1992. Initially referred to as Dongfeng Citroën Automobile Company (DCAC), this joint venture company situated itself in Wuhan. Its first product was a hatchback built from semi-complete knock-down kits, the ZX Fukang, and by 1996 production capacity had reached 150,000 units/year with a second offering, the Fukang 988 sedan, being added in 1998. The project may not have seen great success due to a limited product line and delays from the beginning. In addition, early reliance on Shanghai's industrial base (and with it stretched supply chains) for locally sourced parts may have proved a hindrance; at the very least to the development of Wuhan's own industrial cluster. As of 1997, DCAC counted amount its component suppliers 80% more Shanghai firms than those based in Wuhan, and in the early 2000s easily 50% of locally sourced parts continued to come from Shanghai.

In 2002, the first Peugeot-branded product was introduced and the JV was renamed Dongfeng Peugeot-Citroën Automobile (DPCA). That same year saw the joint venture held with equal equity between its French and Chinese parents, but it wasn't until 2004 that Chinese and French banks relaxed their grip on the firm and true 50% ownership stakes were each taken by Dongfeng and PSA Peugeot Citroën.

While most current offerings are versions of cars available in other markets, some vehicles have been tailored to better suit local demand such as changing hatchbacks to three-box designs. At least one car, sold under the name Citroën C2, appears to have been reworked extensively; confusingly the Chinese version C2 seems to have been a rebadged Peugeot model—not the "actual" Citroën C2.

Operations

Production bases and facilities

As of 2010, the joint venture has three production bases—all in Hubei province. A fourth was set to become operational  2016 in Chengdu, Sichuan province, increasing production capacity by 300,000 units per year. With the completion of this factory, total yearly production capacity will approach one million whole vehicles.

A Xiangyang production base makes engines with capacity in excess of one million, yearly, and has been operational since 1996.

Stellantis has two facilities in Shanghai—an R&D center (the China Tech Center) and a design center.

Dealer network
Its dealer network boasts nearly 300 Citroën shops in over 200 Chinese cities and about 170 Peugeot showrooms (other sales and service stores that carry and cater to Peugeots do exist). As of 2010, imported models are also sold although by a separate, wholly PSA-owned subsidiary, Peugeot Citroën (China) Automotive Trade Co Ltd. It's possible the situation has changed as of 2015 since in that year Groupe PSA signed an agreement with Dongfeng to sell some imports.

Ownership
Ownership of the joint venture has evolved since its establishment in 1992. In 2000, ownership was: 31%, Dongfeng Motor Corporation; 39%, Chinese banks; 26.9%, PSA Peugeot Citroën; 3.1%, international banks. In 2002, both Dongfeng and PSA Peugeot Citroën took equal 32% shares, and by 2004 they had bought out the remaining equity stakes held by banks resulting in each vehicle-maker holding 50% ownership of the joint venture. After the IPO, the stake held by Dongfeng Motor Corporation was transferred to Dongfeng Motor Group.

In a rare move for the industry, 2014 saw Dongfeng Motor Group take a 14% stake in the then-ailing PSA Peugeot Citroën, a parent company of DPCA.

Sales figures

Recent Products

Footnote

References

External links
 

Chinese companies established in 1992
Vehicle manufacturing companies established in 1992
Car manufacturers of China
Dongfeng Motor joint ventures
Stellantis